Vesicle-trafficking protein SEC22a is a protein that in humans is encoded by the SEC22A gene.

The protein encoded by this gene belongs to the member of the SEC22 family of vesicle trafficking proteins. This protein has similarity to rat SEC22 and may act in the early stages of the secretory pathway. There is evidence for the use of multiple poly A sites in this gene.

References

Further reading